Gallaway is a city in Fayette County, Tennessee, United States. The population was 680 at the 2010 census.

Geography
Gallaway is located in northwestern Fayette County at  (35.326725, -89.616484). U.S. Routes 70 and 79 pass through the northwest side of the city as a single two-lane highway, leading northeast  to Braden and southwest  to Arlington. Tennessee State Route 196 leads south  to Hickory Withe.

The Loosahatchie River, a tributary of the Mississippi, flows from east to west through the southern part of the city limits.

Demographics

As of the census of 2000, there were 666 people, 235 households, and 145 families residing in the city. The racial makeup of the city was 39.94% White, 59.01% African American, 0.15% Native American, and 0.90% from two or more races.

There were 235 households, out of which 31.5% had children under the age of 18 living with them, 29.8% were married couples living together, 28.9% had a female householder with no husband present, and 37.9% were non-families. 36.2% of all households were made up of individuals, and 11.9% had someone living alone who was 65 years of age or older. The average household size was 2.49 and the average family size was 3.26.

In the city, the population was spread out, with 28.1% under the age of 18, 9.0% from 18 to 24, 21.5% from 25 to 44, 21.9% from 45 to 64, and 19.5% who were 65 years of age or older. The median age was 38 years. For every 100 females, there were 86.0 males. For every 100 females age 18 and over, there were 76.1 males.

The median income for a household in the city was $15,192, and the median income for a family was $23,750. Males had a median income of $25,179 versus $16,500 for females. The per capita income for the city was $12,836. About 35.5% of families and 43.5% of the population were below the poverty line, including 53.6% of those under age 18 and 15.2% of those age 65 or over.

Commerce
The town's largest employer is Medical Action Industries, a producer of plastic medical supplies and patient bedside items.

References

Cities in Tennessee
Cities in Fayette County, Tennessee
Memphis metropolitan area
Superfund sites in Tennessee